The 2005 Vuelta a Asturias was the 49th edition of the Vuelta a Asturias road cycling stage race, which was held from 17 June to 21 June 2005. The race started and finished in Oviedo. The race was won by Adolfo García Quesada of the  team.

General classification

References

Vuelta Asturias
2005 in road cycling
2005 in Spanish sport